The Vientiane–Boten Expressway is a partially completed expressway between Boten, on the China–Laos border, and Vientiane, the capital of Laos. It roughly parallels Route 13.

The expressway is the first in Laos.

Construction of the expressway is divided in four sections:

 Vientiane–Vang Vieng
 Vang Vieng–Luang Prabang
 Luang Prabang–Oudomxay
 Oudomxay–Boten

The first section to be completed is the Vientiane–Vang Vieng Expressway; in June 2020, it was 71% complete and, in December 2020, it was inaugurated. Preparation work for the Vang Vieng–Luang Prabang section was to commence after opening of the Vientiane–Vang Vieng section.

Vientiane–Vang Vieng Expressway 

Construction of the first section began at the end of 2018 and was initially scheduled to finish in 2021, but was already completed on 20 December 2020. The road shortens the trip by 43 km compared with the existing Route 13. The expressway toll will be 550 kip per kilometre, or about 62,000 kip for a one-way trip between Vientiane and Vang Vieng.

The trip from Vientiane to Vang Vieng is shortened from 4 hours to 1.5 hours using the expressway. Speeds on the expressway are designated at 120 km per hour on flat terrain from Sikeut village to in Vientiane Prefecture, and 80 km per hour through the more mountainous section between Phonhong and Vang Vieng Districts. The road includes double tunnels measuring almost  through Phoupha Mountain.

The expressway is 95 percent owned by Chinese developer Yunnan Construction Engineering Group, who are also the developer, and five percent by the Laotian government. The cost is estimated at US$1.2 billion. The developer will retain a 50 year concession on tolls from the expressway.

List of interchanges 

Vientiane 
Ban Nasone
Ban Boua
Ban Saka (Phonkham)
Ban Phonhong (Nam Ngum dam)
Muang Hinherb
Nguem lake (Ban Vangkhi)
Muang Vang Vieng

Vang Vieng–Luang Prabang Expressway 
Once completed, the travel time would be reduced from 6 hours to 90 minutes.

See also 
 Vientiane–Boten railway

References

Roads in Laos